The name Priscilla has been used for seven tropical cyclones in the Eastern Pacific Ocean:
 Hurricane Priscilla (1967) 
 Hurricane Priscilla (1971) 
 Tropical Storm Priscilla (1975) 
 Hurricane Priscilla (1983)  
 Tropical Storm Priscilla (1989)  
 Tropical Storm Priscilla (2013)
 Tropical Storm Priscilla (2019)

The name Priscilla has also been used for one tropical cyclone in the Western Pacific Ocean: 
 Typhoon Priscilla (1946)

Pacific hurricane set index articles
Pacific typhoon set index articles